Sean Jeffrey Tindell  (born October 5, 1973) is an American lawyer serving as Mississippi Public Safety Commissioner appointed by Governor Tate Reeves. He was formerly a judge on the Mississippi Court of Appeals and a member of the Mississippi State Senate representing District 49 on the Mississippi Gulf Coast, covering parts of Biloxi and Gulfport.

Early life and education 
Sean J. Tindell was born in Gulfport, Mississippi, in 1973 and has resided there his entire life. Tindell graduated from Gulfport High School in 1992 and then attended the University of Southern Mississippi in Hattiesburg. Tindell graduated from USM in 1996 with a Bachelor's degree and then in 1998 received his Master's degree in business administration. Tindell then attended Mississippi College School of Law in Jackson and earned his J.D. degree  in 2001.

Career 
Tindell was an Assistant District Attorney from 2002 to 2007. In 2007 Sean Tindell ran for County Attorney in Harrison County and was defeated in a narrow race. In 2011, Tindell successfully sought to fill the seat of long time senator Billy Hewes, who was running for lieutenant governor.

Tindell is an attorney with the Tindell Law Firm, PLLC, located in Gulfport.

References

External links 
 Campaign website
 
 

1973 births
Living people
Mississippi College School of Law alumni
Mississippi Court of Appeals judges
Mississippi lawyers
Republican Party Mississippi state senators
People from Gulfport, Mississippi
University of Southern Mississippi alumni
21st-century American judges
21st-century American politicians